Of an Age is a 2022 Australian romantic drama film, directed and written by Goran Stolevski. The film stars Elias Anton as Kol, a Serbian immigrant in Australia who enters a brief but intense romance with Adam (Thom Green), the brother of his ballroom dance partner Ebony (Hattie Hook).

The film premiered on 4 August 2022 at the Melbourne International Film Festival. It was subsequently screened at CinefestOZ, where it was the winner of the Best Film Award. Of an Age was released in the United States by Focus Features on 17 February 2023, and will be later in Australia by Roadshow Films on 23 March 2023.

Cast
 Elias Anton as Kol
 Thom Green as Adam 
 Hattie Hook as Ebony 
 Toby Derrick as Jacob
 Grace Graznak  as Cora
 Jessica Lu  as Jenny
 Jack Kenny  as Mellor
 Kasuni Imbulana  as Tari
 Verity Higgins as Fay

Critical reception

References

External links
 
 
 
 
 

2022 films
2022 LGBT-related films
2022 drama films
Australian drama films
Australian LGBT-related films
LGBT-related drama films
Gay-related films
2020s English-language films
Films directed by Goran Stolevski
Focus Features films
2020s Australian films